Kaprun is a municipality in the Zell am See District in the state of Salzburg, Austria. The town is a tourist destination known as "Zell am See-Kaprun" with the neighbouring Zell am See and known for the glacier Kitzsteinhorn.

Geography
It is located in the Pinzgau region on the northern slopes of the Alpine Glockner Group with Mt. Großes Wiesbachhorn, part of the Hohe Tauern range, forming the border of Salzburg with Carinthia. Located at the foot of the Kitzsteinhorn Glacier, Kaprun is a year-round sports centre. The Kapruner Ache creek joins the Salzach River south of the settlement. The Mooserboden hydroelectric plant uses water from two reservoirs held back by some of Austria's largest dam walls. The reservoir area has become a tourist attraction, with views over the towns of Kaprun and Zell am See. The visitors centre gives guided tours of the area. Tauern Spa World was completed in November 2010 and is the second largest spa complex in Austria. It is a two-hour transfer to resort from Salzburg Airport.

History

A Chataprunnin (derived from Celtic for "whitewater") settlement in the Duchy of Bavaria was first mentioned in a 931 deed, documented as a possession held by the Counts of Falkenstein in 1166. Chaprunne Castle was acquired by the Prince-Archbishops of Salzburg in 1287 and enfeoffed to the Lords of Felben in 1338. Seat of a Salzburg burgrave from 1480, it was devastated during the 1526 German Peasants' War. In 1606 Archbishop Wolf Dietrich Raitenau had the local burgrave beheaded for siding with local insurgents. In the early 20th century the castle was a possession of Prince Johann II of Liechtenstein, who sold it in 1921. In the late 1920s the German AEG company and the Salzburg state government developed plans for a Hohe Tauern hydroelectricity power plant, including two reservoirs in the Kaprun Valley. Planning was discontinued during the Great Depression and was not resumed until the Austrian Anschluss to Nazi Germany in 1938. Commanded by Hermann Göring, construction began during World War II using prisoners of war from Belgium and other occupied countries and Jewish and Soviet forced labourers. The inhumane conditions were depicted by Nobel laureate Elfriede Jelinek in her 2003 play Das Werk. Construction stopped in 1942/43, and was restarted after the war by Allied-occupied Austria from 1947. Built with Bucyrus equipment and massive help from the Marshall Plan European Recovery Program, the power plant became an icon of post-war reconstruction. The topping out ceremony was held on 23 September 1955, a few months after the signing of the Austrian State Treaty.

Gletscherbahnen

The Kitzsteinhorn is accessed by the Gletscherbahn 1, an aerial lift in three sections, opened on 12 December 1965 to develop the area for glacier skiing. The lowest section, running from Kapruner Thoerl up to the Salzburg Hut, is 2028 metres long and climbs 970 metres in altitude. The second section, to the Krefeld Hut, climbs 554 metres. This section includes the world's tallest aerial lift pylon, a steel framework construction 113.9 metres (originally 106 meters) high. This pillar was built in 1966 and has of a pipe of  diameter in the center, in which a ladder and a maintenance elevator are installed.

Gletscherbahn 2 was a funicular railway with two carriages running from Kaprun to the Kitzsteinhorn which opened on 23 March 1974. On 11 November 2000, it was the site of the Kaprun disaster, in which 149 skiers lost their lives in a tunnel fire. Six more deaths occurred indirectly. Three died in the shop and restaurant because of smoke. The attendant in the burning train died with the 149 skiers. The smoke killed the attendant and the only passenger in the other identical train. Only twelve people survived the disaster. The tunnel and the funicular railway have remained closed since then. A memorial to the victims, located opposite the present valley station, was dedicated on 11 November, 2004.

See also
 Kaprun disaster

References

External links

 Zell am See-Kaprun Tourist Office
 
 skyscraperpage.com
 Panoramic virtual tours of Kaprun
 Kaprun's 840MW hydroelectric station 
 Kaprun ski resort news

Cities and towns in Zell am See District
Glockner Group
Holocaust locations in Austria